Ernobiini is a tribe of beetles in the family Ptinidae. There are at least 4 genera and 70 described species in Ernobiini.

Genera
These genera belong to the tribe Ernobiini:
 Episernomorphus Thomson, 1863 i c g b
 Episernus Thomson, 1859 i c g b
 Ernobius Roubal, 1917 g
 Paralobium Fall, 1905 i c g
Data sources: i = ITIS, c = Catalogue of Life, g = GBIF, b = Bugguide.net

References

Further reading

External links

 

Ptinidae